Charles Heung Wah-keung is a Hong Kong actor-turned-film producer and presenter. As founder of Win's Entertainment in the 1980s and China Star Entertainment Group in the 1990s, he has helped established the careers of various cinematic icons in Hong Kong that include Stephen Chow, Chow Yun-fat, Johnnie To, Jet Li and Andy Lau among countless others. Apart from being one of the most successful film producers in Hong Kong, Heung is also one of the most controversial due to his family's triad background.

Background
Heung is widely suspected of ties to one of Hong Kong's largest and most powerful organized crime groups, the Sun Yee On Triad. Heung's father, Heung Chin, founded the Sun Yee On in 1919. Charles is the tenth of the Sun Yee On founder's thirteen children.

Heung Chin's eldest son, Heung Wah-yim, was convicted in 1988 of being the triad's boss, although his conviction in Hong Kong was overturned on a technicality. The Senate Subcommittee on Investigations also identified him as the triad's leader in a 1992 report on Asian organized crime.

In the 1970s, Charles subsequently married Betty Ting, the actress, who is remembered today primarily because of the "mysterious" death of Bruce Lee in her apartment. The marriage, however did not last, and Charles later married Tiffany Chen, in the early 1980s.

Charles is the older brother of Jimmy Heung, who later became his partner in the formation of Win's Entertainment. The partnership between the two ended in 1992 as Charles felt that Jimmy's style of negotiating business too closely resembled that of a triad member. While Charles sees Jimmy as a "good triad," it is widely believed that Jimmy has moved on, and supposedly runs the triad to this day.

Charles was one of several Heung brothers identified in 1992 by the United States Senate Permanent Subcommittee of Investigations as top office-bearers in the Sun Yee On. Two years later, a former Red Pole for the Sun Yee On, testifying in a Chinatown racketeering case in a Brooklyn Federal Court, identified Charles as one of "the top guys, the biggest," in the society. A year after that, the Royal Commission for Canada sent Heung a letter rejecting his application for a Visa, citing evidence placing him squarely on the ruling council of the Sun Yee On.

Heung agrees that his family has what he calls "a Triad background," but says that he personally has little knowledge of such things, and has had to labor hard to overcome the stigma. He also admits that some people may fear him, but says his business philosophy is to get top actors, actresses and directors to make movies for him because they like him.

In 2000, when his brother Heung Wah-Po was arrested for setting fire to his own apartment (after quarreling with his mistress), Charles refused to help him and publicly announced that he did not know his brothers well since they were given birth by different mothers. To this day, Heung continues to steer clear away from his family's triad background.

Career
Heung started off as an actor making films (mostly martial arts films) in Taiwan during the 1970s, before later becoming a producer. While the triad's influence in Hong Kong cinema became notorious, Heung tried to keep himself away from his family's triad image by creating a company of safe refuge. In 1984, he and his brother, Jimmy Heung, formed Win's Entertainment Ltd., which, beside Golden Harvest, became one of the most successful film studios in Hong Kong. Charles was quoted for saying that, "Every film is a battle" when asked why he named the production company Win's.

Virtually every major star in Hong Kong, except for Jackie Chan, had made a film for the Heungs. Jet Li, the biggest martial-arts star in Hong Kong, began making movies exclusively for Heung after his manager was shot dead in 1993. Andy Lau joined Win's' stable of stars after one of his associates, a 26-year-old woman, was hospitalized for injuries she received when her apartment was firebombed. Hong Kong police believed that both incidents were related to triad gang activity.

Heung became a producer and a presenter for films, but he also became famous from acting in supporting roles during the 1990s, with his best known role being as Lung Wu, the God of Gamblers' bodyguard in God of Gamblers and its numerous sequels and spin-offs. He also appeared in other films, making a cameo appearance in The Prince of Temple Street and co-starring in Casino Raiders, which was co-directed by his brother, Jimmy. In 1993, he received a Hong Kong Film Award nomination for his supporting role in Arrest the Restless.

In 1992, Heung formed China Star Entertainment Group and became the studio's chairman and CEO, with his wife, Tiffany Chen, serving as vice-chairman and administrative producer.  As a producer, Heung has highlighted a majority of Hong Kong's biggest cinematic icons, including Jet Li, Andy Lau, Sammi Cheng, Cecilia Cheung, Simon Yam, and Lau Ching-Wan. This includes filmmakers, such as Johnnie To, Wai Ka-Fai, Wong Jing, Herman Yau and Dennis Law.

In 1999, Heung established One Hundred Years of Film Co. Ltd., a subsidiary for China Star. His initial plan for the company was to make at least 100 films within three years

Heung plans to continue producing and presenting films, now aiming for big-budgeted projects. Following the partnership split between himself and his brother, Heung closed down the Win's Entertainment studio in 2000, and continued to produce and distribute films under the China Star label.

Heung is the Director of Jet Li One Foundation (Hong Kong) and the Director of Beijing Normal University One Foundation Philanthropy Research Institute.  Apart from focusing its effort on the relief programs for the Poverty and Victims of Natural Disaster, Jet Li One Foundation also established the Beijing Normal University One Foundation Philanthropy Research Institute, the first of its kind in China to conduct trainings, formal education programs in Philanthropy.

After surviving the 2004 South Asian tsunami in Maldives, Jet Li started his long-time vision to action, i.e. to help the people in need. In 2005, Jet Li then established the Jet Li One Foundation in Hong Kong, a charity organisation to help the Poverty and Victims of Natural Disaster. Heung and his wife shared the same view of Jet after such a severe disaster and decided to support One Foundation. Heung and his wife not simply make the donations, they also take an active role in organising and proceeding the Fund Raising events.
	
In year 2007, One Foundation was geographically extended to Mainland China.  Apart from making donation, Heung and his wife also raised funds from their friends Pierre Chen, Choi Chi-ming, Chu Yuet-wah, Mr Li Chi-keung and his wife for the startup of Jet Li One Foundation in China. In year 2010, Jet Li One Foundation (Hong Kong) donated an amount of HK$1 million to Project Vision Charitable Foundation to provide free cataract surgery for senior patients.

Personal life 
In 1970s, Heung married his first wife Betty Ting Pei. They have a daughter. They divorced around 1979.In 1980, Heung married his current wife Taiwan-based Tiffany Chen. They have two sons, Jacky and Johnathan. Jacky is also a martial actor.
In December 2020, Heung and his son, Jacky Heung, applied for permanent residence in Taiwan; both applications were denied in February 2021 on the basis of "danger of threatening national interest, public safety, or public order or engaging in terrorist activities." Heung publicly supported the Hong Kong National Security Law, while his wife Tiffany Chen criticized protesters during the 2019-20 Hong Kong protests. Additionally, Jacky Heung was reported by Taiwanese media to be a member of the pro-communist All-China Youth Federation.

Heung was also vice president of the China Film Foundation, which a Taiwanese lawmaker said has been conducting propaganda for mainland China, and thus it was correct to reject Heung's application. Additionally, the Liberty Times stated that Heung had a criminal record in Taiwan, and that he has been denied entry into Taiwan several times.

References

External links
 
 China Star Entertainment Website
 The H.K. Actor Index
 One Hundred Years of Film Co. Ltd. (founders and filmography)
 China Star Entertainment Group (founders and filmography)
 Signs of New Life at AsiaWeek.com
 Kaiji Shakedown: CHINA STAR CLOSING ITS DOORS?
 Newsclipping-Jet Li One Foundation
 Newsclipping-Establishment of Beijing Normal University One Foundation Philanthropy Research Institute

1948 births
Living people
Hong Kong male film actors
Hong Kong film presenters
Hong Kong film producers
People from Lufeng
Hong Kong male television actors
Hong Kong television presenters
20th-century Hong Kong male actors